College of Saint Michael is a private Catholic primary and secondary school and technical college, located in Amparibe, Antananarivo, Madagascar. The co-educational institution was founded in 1888 by the Society of Jesus.

History
In the 1840s six French Jesuits from Lyons began proselytizing and educating the outlying settlements . By 1855 they were able to get into the capital. With the advent of King Radama II in 1861, Christians were free to preach. Thus, the Jesuits and the Sisters of St. Joseph of Cluny settled in the capital, and opened schools and churches.

The internal life of the college survived the abolition of the European section (1906 to 1934). Then followed the start of secondary education (1935), the closing of Madagascar College (1942), and new programs: Philosophy (1952), Elementary Mathematics (1956), Experimental Sciences (1960) and the Baccalaureate (1955). Coeducation began with the first girls admitted in 1966. In 1983 the Higher Technical Institute (1983) opened on the premises. In 1986 the literature sector was restored.

, the school's enrollment included 2202 students:, 1340 Catholics, 799 Protestants, and 63 others; 2039 boys and 163 girls.

Sports
Saint-Michel has a swimming club with many good results. Its table tennis teams have won national championships at many levels.

Notable alumni

 Sennen Andriamirado - journalist
 Ludger Andrianjaka - singer
 Jean-Joseph Rabearivelo - poet
 Fulgence Rabeony - Archbishop of Madagascar
 Pascal Rakotomavo - politician
 Justin Rakotoniaina - politician
 Gabriel Ramanantsoa - general
 Ignace Ramarosandratana - first Malagasy bishop
 Didier Ratsiraka - admiral
 Jean-Louis Ravelomanantsoa - athlete
 Francisque Ravony - politician
 Armand Razafindratandra -  former Cardinal Archbishop of Madagascar

See also

 Catholic Church in Madagascar
 Education in Madagascar
 List of Jesuit schools

References  

Jesuit secondary schools in Madagascar
Educational institutions established in 1888
Catholic universities and colleges in Madagascar
1888 establishments in Madagascar
Jesuit primary schools in Madagascar
Vocational education in Africa
19th-century architecture in Madagascar